The Jordan EJ14 was the fourteenth Jordan Formula One car.  It was used by the team to compete in the 2004 Formula One season. The car itself was not a totally new car; instead it was a major upgrade of the previous year's uncompetitive EJ13. The chassis itself was modified and combined with a new aerodynamic package and more powerful Ford-badged Cosworth engine. It also had a return to a single-keel suspension layout. However, the team's small budget meant that little or no testing of the cars was carried out, both before the season and during it. Unsurprisingly, the car was just as uncompetitive as its predecessor. The lack of speed was blamed on a lack of power coming from the Cosworth engine, which the team claimed was not the same as those being used by Jaguar, Ford's works team.

The team had only just survived the winter break after the  season, and when the EJ14 broke cover for the first time, it carried the message "Lazarus", referring to the team's resurrection from the dead. For the rest of the season the car would run with various messages of peace on the engine over. These included a dove at the 2004 Australian Grand Prix, and a picture of Ayrton Senna at the San Marino GP, to commemorate the tenth anniversary of his death.  The changing images were chosen by the Bahraini government, who purchased sponsorship space on the team's engine cover to celebrate the inaugural Bahrain Grand Prix.

It was driven by Nick Heidfeld, who was swapped with Sauber in favour of Giancarlo Fisichella and Formula 3000 driver Giorgio Pantano were the two drivers. Heidfeld was chosen for his skill, while Pantano got a drive primarily because he had sponsors who would contribute money to the team. It was expected that unemployed Jos Verstappen would take the second seat, but the deal for him to drive fell through. In Canada, Pantano was replaced by German Timo Glock, as Pantano's backers were unable to pay for his drive in time. Glock went on to score two points in that race after both Williamses and Toyotas were disqualified for brake duct infringements. Glock would then replace Pantano for good in the final three rounds, when it became clear that Pantano would not be able to pay for his seat any longer.

However, the team's budget was very small, which directly affected their performance. Benson and Hedges was the main sponsor, with only smaller sponsors such as Trust contributing small amounts of money to the team's budget. A lack of testing and development, plus the need to have drivers who could pay for their seat, rather than be skilled, affected the team's results.

The car's performance and reliability were generally poor all year. A total of 5 points were scored all year. Heidfeld drove to seventh place at Monaco, and both Jordans were promoted to 7th and 8th after the Canadian race due to multiple cars getting disqualified. However, it was still the first time in the team's history that a top-six result had not been achieved. There were other points-scoring opportunities, but poor luck and poor reliability robbed the team of these chances. Most notably Heidfeld was running strongly at the carnage-packed US Grand Prix, and looked set for points when his engine failed. Points could also have been scored at Spa, but both drivers were involved in accidents, with Pantano out on lap 1, and Heidfeld finishing 10th, but 5 laps down. Occasionally the Jordans were able to fight with other teams, notably Sauber, but more commonly Jaguar and Toyota. But for the most part, the EJ14s would spend their time running behind most of the field, with just the Minardis behind.

The team's future was put into doubt late in the season when Ford announced it was withdrawing from F1, leaving the team with no engines for the following year. For a while it appeared that the team would close immediately after the final race of the season. Only a late deal to run Toyota engines for  saved the team.

Complete Formula One results
(key) (results in bold indicate pole position) 

* Denotes Cosworth-built engines, badged as Ford

References

External links

Jordan Formula One cars
2004 Formula One season cars